Little Laver is a village and a civil parish in the Epping Forest district of Essex, England.

Little Laver's parish church is dedicated to St Mary the Virgin.

At the end of the 19th century Little Laver's population fell just below 100 households and has since remained about this level.

References

External links 
 
 Little Laver: Manors, British History Online
 Little Laver Essex, A Vision of Britain Through Time
 Listed Buildings in Little Laver, Essex, England, British Listed Buildings

Villages in Essex
Epping Forest District
Civil parishes in Essex